Poole Lifeboat Station is the base for Royal National Lifeboat Institution (RNLI) search and rescue operations at Poole, Dorset in England. The first lifeboat was stationed at Poole Harbour in 1865 and the present station was opened in 1988. Since November 2016 it has operated two inshore lifeboats, an Atlantic 85 and a D class.

History
The first boathouse was built in 1865 at Sandbanks by the narrow entrance to the large, natural Poole Harbour. This was remote from the house in Poole which meant that the crew had to be collected by horse-drawn coach from the Antelope Hotel in the High Street and taken to Sandbanks.

In 1882 a new boathouse was built on land leased from Poole Corporation on the Fisherman's Dock at the east end of Poole Quay. A dedicated slipway was built in front of the boathouse in 1897 as the public slipway was often blocked by other boats. In 1887 a flagstaff had been erected so that messages could be exchanged with Sandbanks. At this time the crew was summoned to launches by a signal rocket. In 1892 this was changed to a signal mortar but this reverted to rockets in 1914 as the mortar being discharged could be mistaken for an explosion at the nearby gas works.

In 1939 a  motor lifeboat was placed on station and the last 'pulling and sailing' lifeboat at Poole was withdrawn. This was the Thomas Kirk Wright, which on 30 May 1940 sailed to Dunkirk as one of boats summoned to Operation Dynamo, indeed it was the first of 19 lifeboats to arrive there. It was manned by the Royal Navy but was damaged by enemy fire. After repairs a second trip across the channel was made on 2 June 1940 before eventually returning to more normal duties at Poole.

An inflatable Inshore Rescue Boat was added to the station in 1964 but withdrawn in 1970, although by this time a Dell Quay Dory was also in use. This was withdrawn in 1985 but ten years later a B Class ILB was placed on station.

The boathouse at Fisherman's Dock was closed in 1974 and a new station opened with the Poole Harbour Yacht Club at Lilliput Marina. The following year the old boathouse became a museum with the Thomas Kirk Wright as the main exhibit. The museum was handed back to the council in 1991. It closed in 2004 but reopened in 2006.

Another move came in 1989 when the lifeboat was moved back to Poole Quay, but this time at the west end beneath Poole Bridge. The following year new crew facilities and storerooms were constructed by adding a two-storey extension to the police office on Poole Quay. In 1994 a floating boathouse was placed next to the lifeboat mooring for the new ILB that took up service at Poole the following year. In November 2016, with the advent of 25 knot boats at flanking stations, the RNLI decided to withdraw the all weather lifeboat from Poole and stationed a D-class inflatable to work alongside the existing Atlantic 85.

Description
The crew facilities and storeroom occupies one part of a larger brick-built building facing the water on Poole Quay. The upper floor is set into the roof with a large window overlooking the lifeboat's pontoon. The boathouse for the ILB is moored alongside this pontoon and is constructed of corrugated metal.

Current fleet

  B-826 Sgt Bob Martin (On station 2008)
 D-class (1B1) D-804 Gladdys Maud Burton (on station 2016)

Former lifeboats
'ON' is the RNLI's sequential Official Number; 'Op. No.' is the operational number painted onto the boat.

Pulling and sailing lifeboats
This list is incomplete

Motor lifeboats

Inshore lifeboats and boarding boats

See also
 List of RNLI stations

References

External links

 Official station website
 RNLI station information
 Poole Old Lifeboat Museum and Shop

Lifeboat stations in Dorset
Buildings and structures in Poole
Museums in Poole